Amblymora conferta is a species of beetle in the family Cerambycidae. It was described by Pascoe in 1867. It is known from the Celebes Islands.

References

Amblymora
Beetles described in 1867